The TQ-12 (lit. Sky Lark 12) is a gas-generator cycle rocket engine burning liquid methane and liquid oxygen under development by Landspace. TQ-12 is the first Chinese liquid rocket engine developed with private funding. The engine has been designed to produce  of thrust at sea level.

History
The engine passed its first power pack test including the turbopump, valves, ignition components, and the gas generator at a LandSpace facility in Huzhou on March 25, 2019. The engine's first full assembly was delivered in May 2019, and a hot fire test was successfully conducted the same month. The engine passed its first 200 seconds variable thrust test on October 26, 2019.  Series of 400s hot fire tests were conducted in January 2021 and the first-stage engine assembly for LandSpace's Zhuque-2 rocket was completed in February 2021. It consists of four TQ-12 engines providing a takeoff thrust of 268 tons. 37 TQ-12 family engines have been built by LandSpace as of July 31, 2022, with a hot fire test duration of more than 20,000 seconds. A record-breaking 3357 seconds of hot firing time were accumulated by one engine after it was started 11 times. In August 2022, Landspace successfully tested the improved TQ-12A. Compared with the original TQ-12, the engine thrust is increased by 9%, the specific impulse is increased by 40 m/s, and the weight is reduced by 100kg.  On December 14, 2022, Zhuque-2 completed its maiden flight. Four TQ-12 engines powered the first stage, which performed normally during the flight. However, the TQ-11 vernier engines used in the second stage failed, and the rocket was lost.

References

Rocket engines of China
Rocket engines using methane propellant
Rocket engines using the gas-generator cycle